Public transport in Debrecen, Hungary, is provided by DKV (short for Debreceni Közlekedési Vállalat – Public Transport Company of Debrecen; complete name is DKV Zrt.)

Before mid-2009 two companies provided public transport in the city: trams and trolleybuses were operated by DKV while buses were operated by Hajdú Volán, which provides transport in the rest of Hajdú-Bihar county. DKV took over bus transport on 1 July after winning a tender. DKV has 140 buses (40 of which are articulated buses). All buses are Low-floor and airconditioned.

DKV

The company was founded in 1883 under the name Debrecen Local Tramway Company. They started providing public transport on 2 October 1884 with horse-drawn and steam-powered trams. The first electric tram started operating in 1911. From 1906 the town of Hajdúsámson and later, the town of Nyírbátor were connected to Debrecen by municipal railway, also operated by the same company.

By the 1940s there were already ten tram lines. On 2 June 1944 the city was bombed, and the tramway system was seriously damaged. It was repaired by 1947, and seven tram lines served the city until the 1970s, which brought a decrease in the popularity of trams. Tramways were demolished all over the country, the role of trams was taken over by buses. Today Debrecen is one of only four Hungarian cities to have a tram line, but even here only one line survived. The importance of DKV decreased, and the company lost its leading role in the public transport of Debrecen.

Trolleybuses started operating in 1985, taking over several lines which used to be tram-operated until the 1970s.

The company became state property on 15 July 1950. Today it is owned by the city.

Trams and trolleybuses

Between 1970 and 1984 21 FVV trams entered service. The same tram type was used in Budapest, Miskolc and Szeged, trams for the latter two cities were built by DKV. The company still owns eight of them, but they can rarely be seen on the streets.

The typical blue trams (KCSV-6) of Debrecen were built between 1993-1997. There are only 11 of them in the whole world, all of them in Debrecen.

The company also owns an old nostalgia tram.

The trolleybuses ZiU-9 were manufactured in the Soviet Union, 26 of them entered service since 1985. The four articulated trolleybuses have been in use since 1991. New Solaris Trollino buses are being bought since April 2005, in place of the old Soviet buses. In October 2011 the Spanish firm CAF will be in charge of supply of 18 32-metre Urbos low-floor trams delivered from 2014, for the second tram line which was opened in late February 2014.

Buses 
Since 2009, bus services have also been operated by DKV (expect the three "CORA" bus lines, which is still operated by Hajdú Volán). Currently, there are over 50 routes (only about 30, if routes with A/Y/I/E or 1 signed bus lines are not counted) and 3 bus types:Volvo Alfa Civis 12,18, Mercedes-Benz Conecto G and ITK Reform 500LE (there only 1 from the last type).

Map of tram network

References

External links
 DKV official site (Hungarian/English)
 Hajdú Volán official site (Hungarian)
 Pictures about public transport in the large hungarian cities
 Tram in Debrecen (English, German)

Public transport companies in Hungary
Debrecen
Debrecen
Public transport in Hungary